Charlee Fraser (born 25 December 1995) is an Australian fashion model. As of May 2018, she is ranked as one of the "Top 50" models in the fashion industry by models.com. She was the most booked model of NYFW spring 2018.

Early life
Fraser is of Awabakal Australian heritage; she is the middle child of three siblings.

Career
Fraser was discovered by a photographer in Newcastle, New South Wales. She modeled in Sydney Fashion Week shows before making her début at Alexander Wang F/W 2016, where famous hairstylist Guido Palau gave her and other models distinctive haircuts; that season, she also walked the runway for Derek Lam, Rodarte, Brandon Maxwell, Prada, Marni, Dior, Lanvin, Balenciaga, Givenchy, Mulberry, Céline, Stella McCartney, Tom Ford, Prabal Gurung, and Chanel, Alberta Ferretti, and Chloé among others.

Fraser has been on the cover of Vogue Australia. She has appeared in Vogue (magazine), Vogue Italia, Vogue Mexico, Vogue Japan, Numéro, Russh, and Dazed among others. She co-stars in the Tom Ford "BOYS & GIRLS" cosmetics campaign.

References

Australian female models
Living people
1995 births
Awabakal people